Aisling Sinead Katie Loftus (born 1 September 1990) is a British actress. She began her career as a child actress and gained prominence through her roles in the BBC dramas Five Daughters (2010) and Dive (2010), the play Spur of the Moment, and the film Death of a Superhero (2011). 

She has since appeared in the ITV period drama Mr Selfridge (2013–2015), the BBC series War & Peace (2016) and Broken (2017), and the Sky series A Discovery of Witches (2018–2022) and The Midwich Cuckoos (2022). Her performance in the film Property of the State (2016) earned her an IFTA nomination.

Early life
Loftus was born in Nottingham to Irish parents Paddy and Eileen from Drumcondra, Dublin and Roscrea, County Tipperary; she has an older sister Aoife. Loftus attended St Edmund Campion Catholic Primary School in West Bridgford and later completed A Levels at the Becket School. She was nine when she discovered acting; she took classes at the Television Workshop and participated in the National Theatre Connections. She considered going to drama school, but decided against it when she was cast in Dive whilst on study leave from her A Levels.

Career
Loftus made her television debut in a 2000 episode of the ITV medical drama Peak Practice. This was followed by guest appearances in the CITV series Help! I'm a Teenage Outlaw as well as Casualty, Doctors, and The Bill. In 2009, she starred as Amy in the ITV comedy-drama television film The Fattest Man in Britain and the titular character of Daniel Elliott's short Jade, which won a Silver Bear at the Berlin International Film Festival in 2009. Loftus was named a 2009 Screen International Star of Tomorrow.

In 2010, Loftus starred in the BBC dramas Five Daughters and Dive as Gemma Adams and Lindsey respectively. In her review of Dive, Euan Ferguson of The Observer predicted that Aisling "Ash" Loftus would be a "phenomenon." That same year, Loftus made her London stage debut as Leonie Fowler in Spur of the Moment by Anya Reiss at the Royal Court Theatre. Dominic Cavendish of The Daily Telegraph called her "superb." She also appeared in the Australian film Oranges and Sunshine and the Sky One crime drama Thorne: Sleepyhead.

Loftus starred in the 2011 Irish film Death of a Superhero, for which she was awarded the Special Jury Prize by critics at the 2012 Dublin International Film Festival. She also starred in the television films Page Eight on BBC Two as Melissa Legge and The Borrowers on BBC One as Arrietty Clock, as well as the play Noises Off for its Old Vic and Novello Theatre runs, marking her West End debut. This was followed in by roles in the BBC miniseries Public Enemies as Jade and Good Cop as Cassandra.

In 2013, Loftus began starring in the ITV period drama Mr. Selfridge as Agnes Towler, a role she would play for the first three series. In 2016, she played Sonya Rostova in the BBC adaptation of War & Peace, and appeared in the films Pride & Prejudice & Zombies and Property of the State. For the latter, she was nominated for Best Lead Actress in a Film at the 14th Irish Film & Television Awards. 

In 2017, she played Joan in the 40th anniversary production of Stephen Lowe's Touched at Nottingham Playhouse alongside fellow Television Workshop alumni. and Anne in The Treatment at the Almeida Theatre. She appeared in the film Gun Shy, and played PC Dawn Morris in the BBC series Broken.

Loftus began played Sophie Wilson and later Susanna Norman in the 2018 Sky fantasy series A Discovery of Witches. She appeared in Aristocrats at the Donmar Warehouse. She originated the role of Queenie in Helen Edmundson's 2019 stage adaptation of Small Island at the National Theatre. She returned to the Donmar Warehouse with Far Away in 2020. Loftus starred in the film Homebound and the Sky Max science fiction series The Midwich Cuckoos''.

Personal life
In December 2018, Loftus married actor Jacob Anderson at the Ace Hotel (now One Hundred Shoreditch). The couple have a daughter, born July 2020.

Filmography

Film

Television

Stage

Awards and nominations

References

External links

Loftus on Screen Daily website
LeftLion: Aisling Loftus

Living people
1990 births
21st-century English actresses
Actresses from Nottinghamshire
English film actresses
English people of Irish descent
English television actresses
English stage actresses
Actors from Nottingham